The 115th Pennsylvania House of Representatives District is located in Monroe County and includes the following areas:
 Barrett Township
 Coolbaugh Township
 Middle Smithfield Township (PART, District West)
 Mount Pocono
 Paradise Township
 Pocono Township
 Price Township 
 Stroud Township (PART, Districts 02, 04, and 05)

Representatives

References

Government of Monroe County, Pennsylvania
115